Artemida may refer to:

Artemis, a goddess in Greek mythology
Artemida, Attica, a town in Attica, Greece
Artemida, Elis, a village in Elis, Greece
Artemida, Magnesia, a municipality in Magnesia, Greece

nl:Artemis